Thiviers is a commune in the Dordogne department in Nouvelle-Aquitaine in southwestern France.

Population

Personalities
It is notable as being the town in which Jean-Paul Sartre lived as a child.  Painter Pierre Bouillon was born there.

Geography
The Côle forms part of the commune's northwestern border. Thiviers station has rail connections to Bordeaux, Périgueux and Limoges.

See also
Château de Vaucocour
Communes of the Dordogne department

References

Communes of Dordogne